Beeston Regis is a village and civil parish in the North Norfolk district of Norfolk, England. It is about a mile (2 km) east of Sheringham, Norfolk and near the coast. The village is 2 miles (3 km) west of Cromer and 16 miles (26 km) north of the city of Norwich. According to the 2011 census it had a population of 1,062. There is a frequent bus service on the coast road A149 and a rail service from the nearby stations of Sheringham to the west and West Runton to the east, where the Bittern Line runs a frequent service between Norwich, Cromer and Sheringham. The nearest airport is Norwich International Airport.

The North Sea is the northern boundary of the parish, the parish of Runton forms the western boundary, the wooded Beeston Regis Heath forms the southern boundary with the parish of Aylmerton and the parish of Sheringham lies to the west.

History
There are few traces of early antiquity in Beeston Regis. However, evidence of Roman habitation was found on Beeston Regis Heath in 1859 when a complete set of quern-stones were found dating from Roman times. Quern-stones were used to grind materials, the most important of which was usually grain to make flour for bread.

On Beeston Regis Heath there are circular pits called 'Hills and Holes' (from the first edition of the Ordnance Survey map of the area). They are thought to date from prehistoric times. During the Saxon-Norman to Medieval periods these pits were dug to obtain iron ore, which was then smelted in a furnace to produce iron.

Domesday Book
Beeston Regis is mentioned in Domesday Book of 1086, where it is called Besetune and Besetuna/tune. The main landholders of the parish were William d'Ecouis and Hugh de Montfort. The main tenant was Ingulf, The survey also lists ½ a mill. In the Domesday survey fractions were used to indicate that the entry, in this case a mill, was on an estate that lay within more than one parish.

Regis
Beeston Regis was once known as Beeston-next-the-Sea, but from 1399 when Henry Bolingbroke, Earl of Lancaster, became King Henry IV, the name became Beeston Regis. Regis means "of the king", and the living and manor of Beeston became part of the Crown and the Lancaster Inheritance.

St Mary's Priory

Beeston Regis has the remains of an Augustinian priory known as Beeston Regis Priory (St Mary in the Meadow). It was founded in 1216. The priory is listed as Grade I  and is located on the eastern side of Beeston Regis common.

The suppression of the Priory and its school (the priory was finally dissolved in 1538) left no local provision for education. This is believed to have led Sir John Gresham to found Gresham's School at nearby Holt in 1555.

The Priory ruins today
The cloister, to the south of the nave of the priory church, is now part of the Priory Farm garden. To the east of the cloister, still standing, are part of the walls of the chapter house, and also some traces of the dormitory. The refectory and other domestic buildings probably are beneath or have been incorporated into the 18th century Priory Farmhouse, which was probably built from materials from the demolition of the early buildings. Much remains of the main priory church. The north wall still stands practically to the roof level, although the divisions between the windows have long gone. The belfry tower has gone, although the first steps can be seen in a doorway in the south wall. The south wall is only as high as the window-sill level. The west wall is standing almost intact to gable height, although the lining of the original door has been replaced by modern brickwork. The east wall of the transept is entirely gone, except for traces of its junction with the north wall. At the south end of this wall once stood a pillar; the opposite pillar, west of the south door, is almost complete and in a good state of preservation. Also in the transept there is a doorway which leads to what is thought to be a sacristy, and is the only doorway remaining in its original form. The architrave is almost complete. Most of the chapel's window mouldings survive. The chancel at the eastern end of the ruin remains to roof height on the north and south side. The original eastern wall has been demolished, but a flint wall has been built up to window-sill level. The north-east corner still has most of its window mouldings.

The Priory maze
Near the priory is the Priory maze, a popular tourist attraction that includes a café-restaurant and a garden centre. The microclimate in this part of Norfolk enables the owners to grow a collection of rare and exotic plants.

Beeston Regis Common

Beeston Regis Common lies in the valley of Beeston Beck and consists of 24.7 hectares/61 acres of grassland, heath, marsh, fen and secondary woodland.  The part of the common known as the Top Common lies north, whereas the Back Common lies south of the Cromer Road (A149). This is confusing as there is also a neighbourhood in Sheringham called "Back Common", which lies northwest of the "Top Common" and is made worse by the fact that the Backe Common lies within the boundaries of the civil parish of Sheringham.

The common was made a Site of Special Scientific Interest/SA6 in the year 2000 and is habitat for a wide range of mammals, birds, and insects. There are some forty species of rare flowering plants, and fourteen species of British orchids have been recorded on the common due to its special soil conditions. With such a variety of flowers the site is attractive to butterflies. Twenty-six species have been regularly recorded, including green hairstreak, brown argus and Essex skipper. Kingfisher and heron are also visitors to the pond, and no fewer than 19 species of dragonfly/damselfly have been observed. The bird life of the common includes varieties such as chiffchaff, willow warbler, blackcap, common whitethroat, lesser whitethroat, reed warbler and occasionally sedge and grasshopper warblers. Nightjars are occasionally heard. Foxes and muntjac deer along with smaller mammals such as water shrew, field voles, and harvest mice are present. Adders, slowworms and common lizards can also be found on the common.

In November 2007 the Dew pond was reinstated on the Top Common by Sheringham Town Council. Many years ago there were shallow ponds on this part of the common and in 1939 natterjack toads were recorded in and around the ponds along with common and great crested newts. The reinstatement is an attempt to attract more wildlife back to this part of the common. Until the Second World War, goats, ponies and geese were a common sight grazing in and around the ponds.

The Back Common, although not as species-rich as the Site of Special Scientific Interest is home to a great many plants and insects. Around the damper fringes spotted orchids can be found and in some years bee orchids are present along with the occasionally appearance of the southern marsh orchid. In the late spring and early summer the common is as mass of buttercups. Along the edges of Beeston Beck and Sheringham Loke, monkey musk grows in abundance and until a few years ago dittander, a rare plant, was present, although this may have since been lost due to the mowing regime. On the drier areas of the common, trefoils and clovers are present which attract common blue butterflies and the longer grass areas and buttercups are frequented by meadow brown and ringlet butterflies.

All Saints Church and other features

Other features of the village are the cliff-top Parish Church of All Saints (which is a Grade I listed Church and is located in Church Close), dating from the latter part of the 11th century or early in the 12th. The tower arch opening into the nave is 13th century, as are much of the chancel and nave walls. Probably towards the end of the 13th century or early 14th century the church was reconstructed. The existing arcades were inserted into the nave walls onto the aisles, which were constructed at this time, and the nave walls raised to provide for the clerestory, the window arches of which are decorated on the outside with squared flints. The inventory of 1552 makes it clear that there were three bells in the tower, a fourth being added in 1610. The latter is the only one remaining, the others being sold to defray the cost of repairs in 1765.

The strange story of farmer Reynolds' stone. Within the churchyard is a large stone covering a grave. On each side is inscribed the name of the grave's occupant: James Reynolds. This is originally one of a pair which stood at either side of a pathway in the yard of the farmhouse, in the grounds of the ruined Beeston Priory. The path itself led to what is now known as the Abbot's Freshwater Spring Pond. A local tale says that about 1938–41, when both boulders were in place, a farmer named James Reynolds often drove his horse and cart along this pathway. Several times, a hooded grey ghost would hide behind two boulders and would leap out from behind one of the stones at sunset, and try to grab the horse's reins before vanishing. This, although terrifying the animals, seems not to have perturbed the man unduly. However, he ordered that the stone in question be laid upon his grave after his death, in an attempt at 'laying' the apparition. James Reynolds died in 1941 and, in accordance with his wishes, the boulder now lies atop his grave, his wife Ann Elizabeth also being interred there in 1967. There is no record as to whether or not the 'exorcism' was successful, and indeed, a local woman who knew the Reynolds could not confirm the story. The other stone of the pair can now be seen lying against the north wall of the churchyard.

Orben Beck  is a tiny pond of half an acre located in a cliff-top caravan park and only yards from the sea. Depths range from six to twelve feet. The pond is popular with anglers and holds a variety of coarse fish.

Abbey Farmhouse is a Grade II listed building  and is located on the Eastern side of Beeston Regis Common.

Within the parish is Beeston Hall School, the largest boarding preparatory school in East Anglia. Beeston Regis Hall was once a family home of the Wyndham Ketton-Cremers on the Beeston Regis Estate, part of the much larger Felbrigg Estate, the family seat. In 1940 a German bomb hit the school, causing slight damage. The Hall was leased to Thomas Tapping and his wife Bessie, who opened the private Beeston Hall School in 1948. Over the years the school has expanded; it is the biggest employer in the parish. It has also acquired other surrounding land including Beeston Hall Common, which it purchased from the parish of Beeston Regis.

Beeston Hill (Beeston Bump)

Beeston Hill, or Beeston Bump as it is called locally, is a cliff-top hill which overlooks the sea and the village. At 207 feet (63m) high, it is the dominating feature of the parish. The hill, part of Cromer Ridge, was once two symmetrical round flat-topped hills in the shape of giant molehills: geological features known as kames. The two hills were left behind when glaciers retreated northwards at the end of the last Ice age, between 15,000 and 10,000 years ago, a recent event in geological timescales. At that time most of what is now the North Sea was dry land, with the Rhine and the Thames combining to form a giant river estuary. As the ice melted, the sea level rose and the North Sea was formed. Since then, Beeston Bump has been eroded by the sea: most of its seaward side had been washed away by the 1930s. Almost 90 yards (80m) of the cliff have now been lost to the sea, along with a brickworks which stood to the east of the summit and a football pitch. In recent times, coastal erosion has been slowed by building groynes and sea walls along the coast and below the hill.

During low tides on the foreshore of the sandy beach beneath Beeston Bump, one can find the curious paramoudras and flint circles. These are sometimes mixed in with the exposed "Beeston Chalk". In Norfolk, paramoudras are known as "pot stones", due to the shape.

Local folklore tells of the southern slopes of the Bump being festooned with grapevines, tended by the monks of the priory. The Bump can be climbed using the North Norfolk Coastal Path from either the east or west, and is well worth the climb. From the top, there are views of the surrounding land and sea. Each Easter, the combined churches in the area make a pilgrimage carrying a cross to the top of Beeston Bump, and an open-air service takes place.

Beeston Hill Y-Station

During the World War II Beeston Bump was the location for one of the network of Signals Intelligence collection sites: Y-stations. These stations collected material to be passed to the War Office's Government Code & Cypher School at Bletchley Park. There were several of these stations around the east coast and by triangulating the signals, the exact location of enemy shipping could be pinpointed. In an episode of the BBC1 series Coast, the technique was explained and demonstrated. In the same programme, Joy Hale was interviewed by the presenter, Hermione Cockburn. Hale had been a Wren and an operator at the Y-station.

The concrete remains of part of this facility can still be seen on the summit of the hill: the octagonal concrete base measures 3.85 m (13 feet) across, with a channel running west to east across the middle. On the southern edge of the octagon is a raised area of concrete, which is 225 mm (9 inches) higher than the rest of the base. Around the edge of the octagon are the remnants of a reinforced parapet, which has long been removed. There are also signs of a Fletton brick wall running westward away from the raised area. The octagonal shape of the base indicates that a direction-finding station operator's hut stood there. It would have consisted of a double-skinned wooden structure in which the cavity was filled with shingle designed to make them "splinter proof" or "bulletproof".  Two Y stations were operated in Sheringham in World War II, one by the RAF and the other by the Royal Navy.

Footpath
Beeston Regis lies on the Peddars Way & Norfolk Coast Path National Trail, a combination of the Norfolk Coast Path and the Peddars Way.

The legend of Black Shuck
There is a legend in East Anglia about a ghostly black hound from hell that roams the coast and lonely lanes of Norfolk. The hound is the size of a small horse and appears from the depths of Beeston Bump with malevolent flaming red eyes. Anyone confronted by the Doom Dog will be dead within a year. Sometimes, Black Shuck has appeared headless and, at other times, he appears to float on a carpet of mist, rather than running. The Black Shuck often terrifies his victims out of their wits, although the apparition is said not to harm its victims. The legend was the inspiration behind Sir Arthur Conan Doyle's Sherlock Holmes story, The Hound of the Baskervilles. Conan Doyle had been on a golfing holiday at the nearby Links Hotel in West Runton, and it was in the sitting room of the hotel that his friend, Bertram Fletcher Robinson, recounted the legend of the Black Hound from the Bump.

War Memorial
Beeston Regis' War Memorial takes the form of two plaques located inside All Saints' Church. It holds the following names for the First World War:
 Lieutenant Godfrey B. Cook (1895-1918), 20th Hussars
 Second-Lieutenant Robert W. King (1895-1918), 1st Battalion, Cambridgeshire Regiment
 Sergeant Edward Long (1887-1918), 20th Battalion, Durham Light Infantry
 Lance-Sergeant Walter W. Cooper (1895-1916), 8th Battalion, Royal Norfolk Regiment
 Able-Seaman Ernest F. Horne (1894-1916), Hawke Battalion, Royal Naval Division
 Lance-Corporal James J. Turney (d.1915), 7th Battalion, Royal Norfolk Regiment
 Lance-Corporal Frederick Turney (1896-1915), 5th Battalion, Oxfordshire and Buckinghamshire Light Infantry
 Private Harold H. Rogers (1898-1917), 11th Battalion, Argyll and Sutherland Highlanders
 Private Sidney Dyball (1889-1915), 1st Battalion, Essex Regiment
 Private Frederick J. Applegate (1891-1915), 5th Battalion, Royal Norfolk Regiment
 Private Frederick A. Mortimer (1884-1915), 7th Battalion, Royal Norfolk Regiment
 Private Frederick Duffield (1897-1918), 4th Battalion, Duke of Wellington's Regiment

And, the following for the Second World War:
 Lieutenant-Colonel Stuart D. G. Robertson (1908-1943), Suffolk Regiment
 Wing Commander G. Christopher B. Bernard-Smith (1901-1941), No. 254 Squadron RAF
 Commander Edward W. Harrison (1886-1941), HMS Paragon, Hartlepool
 Flying-Officer Richard T. W. Ketton-Cremer (1909-1941), No. 30 Squadron RAF
 Chief Petty Officer Walter W. Harries (1893-1940), HMS Forfar (F30)
 Sub-Lieutenant Peter E. Palmer (1921-1942), 807 Naval Air Squadron, HMS Argus (I49)
 Leading-Aircraftman Charles B. Bensley (1921-1942), Royal Air Force Reserve
 Leading-Aircraftman Roydon W. Duffield (1913-1944), No. 84 Squadron RAF
 Aircraftman-Second Class Ernest J. Sayer (1911-1944), Royal Air Force Reserve
 Gunner James W. Tuck (1912-1942), 122 Field Regiment, Royal Artillery
 Private George T. Page (1921-1944), 2nd Battalion, Cambridgeshire Regiment
 Private Geoffrey W. Steward (d.1944), 7th Battalion, Royal Norfolk Regiment
 Trooper Stanley W. Drummond (1928-1946), 2nd Brigade, Royal Armoured Corps

Destinations from Beeston Regis

See also

Regis (Place)
List of place names with royal patronage in the United Kingdom
Sheringham War Memorial which records people from Beeston Regis
Weybourne

References

External links
Beeston Regis Parish Website
Beeston Regis Church
GENUKI UK Beeston Regis

 
Villages in Norfolk
North Norfolk
Populated coastal places in Norfolk
Civil parishes in Norfolk